Raghavan (Tamil: ராகவன்; Malayalam: രാഘവന്‍) is a South Indian name. It derives from the Sanskrit raghava, meaning "derived from Raghu" or "descendant of Raghu" (an epithet of the Hindu god Rama, an incarnation of Vishnu), plus the Tamil-Malayalam third-person masculine singular suffix -n. Although it is used as a given name in India it has also come to be used as a family name in the United States.

It may refer to:

People
Azhikodan Raghavan, Kerala politician
Edappally Raghavan Pillai, Malayalam poet
K. Raghavan, Malayalam music composer
K. Raghavan Pillai, writer and scholar from Kerala, India
M. K. Raghavan, Member of Parliament from the Kozhikode Lok Sabha seat in Kerala, India
M. V. Raghavan, communist leader from Kerala, India
Muthukulam Raghavan Pillai, Malayalam dramatist, poet, screenwriter, and actor from India
N. S. Raghavan, Indian industrialist
P. Raghavan, Communist Party of India (Marxist) politician from Kasargod district
P. K. Raghavan, former Minister of Kerala, India
P. M. Raghavan, Kerala first-class cricketer
Pa. Raghavan, Tamil writer and journalist from India
Radha Raghavan, (born 1961), Indian National Congress politician
Raghavan N. Iyer, academic and philosopher from Madras, India
Ramnad Raghavan, Indian mridangam player
Raghavan (actor), Indian film actor in Malayalam films
M. R. Srinivasaprasad, Indian cricketer
Srinivasacharya Raghavan, Indian mathematician
Sriram Raghavan, Indian film director and screenwriter
Sumeet Raghavan, Indian film and television actor
Suren Raghavan, Sri Lankan academic
Raghavan Thirumulpad, Ayurvedic scholar and physician from Kerala, India
V. R. Raghavan, Indian military strategist
 V. S. Raghavan, (b. 1925), Tamil actor
 K.G. Raghavan, Malayalee author, Amrutavani,  (Poetic Malayalam rendering of Quran)

Asteroids
24149 Raghavan, asteroid

Films
Raghupathi Raghavan Rajaram, Tamil film
A character in Vettaiyaadu Vilaiyaadu, film

Indian surnames
Indian given names
Tamil masculine given names